Quang Thuận  is a commune (xã) and village in Bạch Thông District, Bắc Kạn Province, in Vietnam.

Populated places in Bắc Kạn province
Communes of Bắc Kạn province